The Oranje Mountains is a mountain range in the Sipaliwini District of Suriname. It is named after the House of Orange-Nassau. Mountains on this range include the Roseveltpiek.

Mountain ranges of Suriname